Songosongo is an administrative ward in Kilwa District of Lindi Region in Tanzania. 
According to the 2012 census, the ward has a total population of 3,056. The ward administers the whole archipelago of the Songosongo Islands, which are composed of 22 coral reefs and  4 coral islands; Songo Songo Island, Fanjove Island, Nyuni Island and Okuza Island. The islands ward's native inhabitants are the Matumbi people. The archipelago is composed of 21 coral reefs including the 4 islands. The ward seat is Songosongo village. In addition there are four hamlets on the islands; Pembeni, Makondeni, Msitumani and Funguni .

References

Wards of Kilwa District
 Islands of Lindi Region
 Islands of Tanzania